Madina is a settlement in Constituency 54 of Port Loko District in the Northern Province, Sierra Leone.

References

Populated places in Sierra Leone